Aliseo has been borne by at least three ships of the Italian Navy and may refer to:

 , previously the Brazilian SS Voador  purchased in 1916. She was discarded in 1920.
 , a  launched in 1942 and transferred to Yugoslavia as Biokovo in 1949.
 , a  launched in 1982. 

Italian Navy ship names